Christopher Paul Camwell is an English footballer player who plays for  side Barwell, where he plays as a winger.

Playing career

Coventry City
Camwell played for Coventry City since joining their Under 9 academy team. He made his first team debut on 30 April 2017, playing 90 minutes in a 3–1 loss to Scunthorpe United.

Coventry United
Camwell joined Coventry United on 20 September 2019, and made his debut five days later scoring in a 6-0 demolition of Selston.

Hereford
On 23 September 2020, Camwell signed for Hereford in the National League North. On 22 May 2021, Camwell was part of the Hereford team that were defeated by Hornchurch in the 2021 FA Trophy Final at Wembley Stadium. On 2 June 2021, he was released.

Hinckley A.F.C.
On 16 October 2021, United Counties League Division One side Hinckley A.F.C. announced the signing of Camwell from Coventry United. Chris made his debut for Hinckley A.F.C. on 17 October 2021, in a United Counties League Division One home fixture against Holwell Sports, with the home team winning the match 4–0. Camwell departed the club on 13 November 2021. He made five appearances and scored three goals whilst at the club.

Bedworth United
On 13 November 2021 Camwell signed for Bedworth United in the Northern Premier League,

Quorn
Camwell left Bedworth United on 11 January 2022, and signed for United Counties League Premier Division North side Quorn.

Barwell
Camwell signed for Southern League Premier Division Central side Barwell on 3 August 2022. He made his debut for Barwell on 6 August 2022 in a Southern League Premier Division Central fixture at home to Hitchin Town, with the player being substituted one minute before half time for Deen Master, following a red card for team mate Kyle Rowley. The match finished 2–1 to the visitors.

Career statistics

Honours
Hereford
FA Trophy: 2020–21 Runner-Up

References

External links

Living people
1998 births
People from Bedworth
English footballers
Coventry City F.C. players
Solihull Moors F.C. players
Nuneaton Borough F.C. players
Hereford F.C. players
Bedworth United F.C. players
Quorn F.C. players
Barwell F.C. players
English Football League players
National League (English football) players
Association football defenders